UFC Fight Night: Diaz vs. Neer (also known as UFC Fight Night 15) was a mixed martial arts event held by the Ultimate Fighting Championship (UFC) on September 17, 2008, at the Omaha Civic Auditorium in Omaha, Nebraska.

Background
The event served as the lead-in to the premiere of The Ultimate Fighter: Team Nogueira vs. Team Mir on Spike TV.

Jeremy Horn was originally scheduled to face Wilson Gouveia on this card, but was injured. He was replaced by Ryan Jensen.

Results

Bonus Awards
Fighters were awarded $30,000 bonuses.

Fight of the Night: Nate Diaz vs. Josh Neer
Knockout of the Night: Alessio Sakara
Submission of the Night: Wilson Gouveia

Purses
Below are the fighter base salaries for the event.  The total base fighter payroll was $305,000.

Nate Diaz — $40,000 ($20,000 to show, $20,000 to win)
Josh Neer — $9,000
Clay Guida — $26,000 ($13,000 to show, $13,000 to win)
Mac Danzig — $15,000
Alan Belcher — $26,000 ($13,000 to show, $13,000 to win)
Ed Herman — $16,000
Eric Schafer — $12,000 ($6,000 to show, $6,000 to win)
Houston Alexander — $13,000
Alessio Sakara — $34,000 ($17,000 to show, $17,000 to win)
Joe Vedepo — $3,000
Wilson Gouveia — $36,000 ($18,000 to show, $18,000 to win)
Ryan Jensen — $4,000
Joe Lauzon — $20,000 ($10,000 to show, $10,000 to win)
Kyle Bradley — $4,000
Jason Brilz — $6,000 ($3,000 to show, $3,000 to win)
Brad Morris — $4,000
Mike Massenzio — $6,000 ($3,000 to show, $3,000 to win)
Drew McFedries — $16,000
Dan Miller — $10,000 ($5,000 to show, $5,000 to win)
Rob Kimmons — $5,000

See also
 Ultimate Fighting Championship
 List of UFC champions
 List of UFC events
 2008 in UFC

References

External links
 Official fight card

UFC Fight Night
2008 in mixed martial arts
Mixed martial arts in Nebraska
Sports in Omaha, Nebraska
2008 in sports in Nebraska